Emerge: The Best of Neocolours is the fourth album by Neocolours, released by Universal Records since Ito Rapadas was now a label manager of the music company originally from Vicor Music Corp. The album consists of the best hits and singles that the band produced for the Filipino audience. It has reached double platinum sales which confirms the band's low key support in the "adult contemporary" genre.  Most of these songs were rendered by new artists such as Shamrock, Metafour, Erik Santos, King, Aaron Agassi and Mark Bautista. Three of the cuts were new material for this release:  "Kasalanan Ko Ba", "Here I Am Again" and "Sandali Lang".

Track listing

References

1999 compilation albums
Neocolours albums